This is a list of interactive movies and interactive games grouped by original year of release.

Pre-1970s 
 Life Targets (1912)
 Auto Test (1954)
 Kinoautomat (1967)

1970s 
 Wild Gunman (1974)
 EVR Race (1975)
 The Driver (1970s)

1980s

1983 
 Astron Belt
 Bega's Battle (Genma Taisen)
 Cliff Hanger
 Cube Quest
 Dragon's Lair
 Interstellar
 Laser Grand Prix
 M.A.C.H. 3
 Space Ace
 Star Rider

1984 
 ALBEGAS
 Badlands
 Cobra Command (Thunder Storm)
 Cosmos Circuit
 Deus Ex Machina
  Firefox Ninja Hayate (Revenge of the Ninja)
 Super Don Quix-ote Thayer's Quest 1985 
 Space Battleship Yamato Road Blaster Time Gal 1987 
 Freedom Fighter (Escape From Cyber City)

 1988 Snatcher 1989 
 Mean Streets 1990s 
 1990 
 Mad Dog McCree 1991 
 Alice: An Interactive Museum Dragon's Lair II: Time Warp It came from the Desert (TurboGrafx-CD version) Martian Memorandum Sherlock Holmes: Consulting Detective Time Traveler Who Shot Johnny Rock? 1992 
 I'm Your Man L-Zone Mad Dog II: The Lost Gold Make My Video Night Trap Sewer Shark Sherlock Holmes: Consulting Detective Vol. II Space Pirates 1993 
 Crime Patrol Dear My Friends Double Switch Dracula Unleashed Gadget: Invention, Travel, & Adventure Ground Zero: Texas Iron Helix Lost in Time Mansion of Hidden Souls Microcosm NFL's Greatest: San Francisco vs. Dallas 1978-1993  Prize Fighter
 Quantum Gate
 Sherlock Holmes: Consulting Detective Vol. III
 Star Wars: Rebel Assault
 Surgical Strike
 The 7th Guest
 The Lawnmower Man
 Voyeur
 Yumimi Mix

1994 
 Bloodwings: Pumpkinhead's Revenge
 Burn:Cycle
 Cadillacs and Dinosaurs: The Second Cataclysm
 Corpse Killer
 Creature Shock
 Crime Patrol 2: Drug Wars
 Critical Path
 Cyberia
 Cyberwar
 Flash Traffic: City of Angels
 J.B. Harold: Blue Chicago Blues
 Jurassic Park
 The Masked Rider: Kamen Rider ZO
 Loadstar: The Legend of Tully Bodine
 Novastorm
 Policenauts
 The Last Bounty Hunter
 Tomcat Alley
 Under a Killing Moon (part of the Tex Murphy series)
 Vortex

1995 
 BioForge
 Brain Dead 13
 Chaos Control
 Connections
 Cyberia 2: Resurrection
 Cyclemania
 D
 Daryl F. Gates' Police Quest: SWAT
 Demolition Man - version for 3DO Interactive Multiplayer console
 Fahrenheit
 Frankenstein: Through the Eyes of the Monster
 Ghostly Desires
 In the 1st Degree
 Johnny Mnemonic: The Interactive Action Movie
 Kingdom II: Shadoan
 McKenzie & Co
 Midnight Raiders
 Mighty Morphin' Power Rangers
 Mr. Payback: An Interactive Movie
 Panic in the Park
 Phantasmagoria
 Psychic Detective
 Quarterback Attack
 Silent Steel
 Slam City Jam
 Snow Job
 Star Wars: Rebel Assault II: The Hidden Empire
 Street Fighter II Movie - An interactive movie based on Street Fighter II: The Animated Movie released only in Japan for the PlayStation and Sega Saturn.
 Supreme Warrior
 The 11th Hour
 The Beast Within: A Gabriel Knight Mystery
 The Daedalus Encounter
 What's My Story?
 Wirehead

1996 
 Angel Devoid
 Bad Mojo
 Enemy Zero
 Fox Hunt
 Goosebumps: Escape from Horrorland
 Hardline
 Harvester
 Mummy: Tomb of the Pharaoh
 Noir: A Shadowy Thriller
 Phantasmagoria: A Puzzle of Flesh
 Realms of the Haunting
 Ripper
 Solar Crusade
 Spycraft
 Star Trek: Borg
 Star Trek: Klingon
 Terror T.R.A.X.
 The Adventures of Pinocchio
 The Pandora Directive (part of the Tex Murphy series)
 Toonstruck
 Urban Runner
 Vampire Diaries
 Voyeur II

1997 
 A Fork in the Tale
 Blue Heat: The Case of the Cover Girl Murders
 Byzantine: The Betrayal
 Eraser: Turnabout
 Lands of Lore: Guardians of Destiny
 Mortal Kombat Mythologies: Sub-Zero
 Riana Rouge
 Temüjin
 The Last Express

1998 
 Alive
 Black Dahlia
 Dark Side of the Moon: A Sci-Fi Adventure
 Dune 2000
 Machi
 Super Adventure Rockman
 Tender Loving Care
 Tex Murphy: Overseer
 The X-Files Game

2000s

2000 
 Love Story
 Star Strike
 The Exterminators

2001 
 Emperor: Battle for Dune
 Point of View
 The Fear

2003 
 Conspiracies

2004 
 The Guy Game

2005 
 Doctor Who: Attack of the Graske
 Façade
 Fahrenheit
 School Days

2006 
 Dreamfall: The Longest Journey
 Railfan: Chicago Transit Authority Brown Line
 Yoomurjak's Ring original Hungarian release
 Choose Your Own Adventure: The Abominable Snowman
 Final Destination 3

2007 
 Railfan: Taiwan High Speed Rail
 The Act
 Return to House on Haunted Hill

2008 
 428: Shibuya Scramble
 Casebook
 Crimeface
 Mystery Case Files: Dire Grove

2009 
 Playmobil: The Secret of Pirate Island

2010s

2010 
 Darkstar: The Interactive Movie
 Heavy Rain
 Mystery Case Files: 13th Skull
 Doctor Who: The Adventure Games

2011 
 Conspiracies II – Lethal Networks
 I Am Playr
 Jurassic Park: The Game
 Take This Lollipop

2012 
 The Oogieloves in the Big Balloon Adventure
 The Silver Nugget
 The Walking Dead

2013 
 Bear Stearns Bravo
 Beyond: Two Souls
 The Stanley Parable
 Hero of Shaolin
 The Walking Dead: Season Two
 The Wolf Among Us
 Kentucky Route Zero
 The Novelist
 Chili or Mango

2014 
 A Bird Story
 D4: Dark Dreams Don't Die
 Game of Thrones
 Tesla Effect: A Tex Murphy Adventure
 Tales from the Borderlands

2015 
 The Beginner's Guide
 Contradiction: Spot the Liar!
 Dreamfall Chapters: The Longest Journey
 Her Story
 Life Is Strange
 Minecraft: Story Mode
 Press X To Not Die
 Until Dawn
 Simulacra

2016 
 Batman: The Telltale Series
 The Bunker
 1979 Revolution: Black Friday
 The Verdict
 The Walking Dead: Michonne
 The Walking Dead: Season Three

2017 
 Guardians of the Galaxy: The Telltale Series
 Late Shift
 Minecraft: Story Mode – Season Two
 Batman: The Enemy Within
 Life Is Strange: Before the Storm
 Planet of the Apes: Last Frontier
 Hidden Agenda
 The Infectious Madness of Doctor Dekker

2018 
 The Awesome Adventures of Captain Spirit
 Black Mirror: Bandersnatch
 Detroit: Become Human
 Life Is Strange 2
 The Quiet Man
 The Shapeshifting Detective
 Steins;Gate Elite
 The Walking Dead: The Final Season
 Stretch Armstrong: The Breakout
 Visitor 来访者

2019 
 The Dark Pictures Anthology: Man of Medan
 Telling Lies
 She Sees Red
 Erica
 A Heist with Markiplier
 Visitor2 来访者2

2020s

2020 
Unbreakable Kimmy Schmidt: Kimmy vs the Reverend
 Tell Me Why
 Death Come True
 There Is No Game: Wrong Dimension 
 The Complex 
Dark Nights with Poe and Munro
The Dark Pictures Anthology: Little Hope
 Batman: Death in the Family (short film)
 Twin Mirror
Gamer Girl
Five Dates

2021 
 Night Book
 I Saw Black Clouds
 Life Is Strange: True Colors
 Escape the Undertaker
 The Dark Pictures Anthology: House of Ashes 
 Bloodshore 
 American Hero
 Make Her Laugh - Tickle Game
 Willage
 Lake
 Road 96
 Twelve Minutes

2022 
 As Dusk Falls
 Cat Burglar
 The Gallery
 Immortality
 In Space with Markiplier
 Not For Broadcast
 The Quarry
 Vladimir's Volition
 Who Pressed Mute on Uncle Marcus?
 神都不良探 Underdog Detective

Upcoming 
Deathtrap Dungeon: The Golden Room
Murderous Muses
Star Wars: Eclipse

References